The 2014 Gay Games, also known as Gay Games 9, were an international multi-sport event and cultural gathering organized by, and specifically for lesbian, gay, bisexual, and transgender (LGBT) athletes, artists and musicians. It was held from August 9 to August 16, 2014 in Cleveland, with some events being held in the nearby city of Akron, Ohio. An estimated 8,000 athletes from more than 50 nations participated in 37 sports and cultural events.

Bidding Process

According to the Federation of Gay Games (FGG), fourteen cities expressed interest in hosting the event. During its annual meeting in Cape Town on October 28, 2008, the FGG announced that four American cities made the deadline and were thus in the running to host the games: Boston, Cleveland, Miami, and Washington, D.C. Of these cities, Boston, Cleveland, and Washington, D.C. submitted bid books by the deadline. The FGG selected Cleveland as the host city on September 29, 2009 during its annual meeting in Cologne, Germany.

Sponsors 
On April 13, 2013, the Cleveland Foundation announced a US$250,000 grant as the presenting sponsor of the event, which was to be known as "The 2014 Gay Games presented by the Cleveland Foundation," marking the first time the Gay Games had had a presenting sponsor. In addition to local support from sponsors such as the Cleveland Clinic, the Cleveland Cavaliers, and the Cleveland Indians, the Games saw major corporate sponsorship from large companies like Coca-Cola, Marriott, and United.

The United Church of Christ became the first religious denomination to be a major sponsor of the Gay Games as a fourth-tier silver sponsor of the Gay Games in 2014.

Also announced as a major sponsor was Ernst & Young, with cash and in-kind services.

Opening Ceremony 

The Opening Ceremony began at 7:00 p.m. on Saturday, August 9, at Quicken Loans Arena. Featured stars at the ceremony included singer, dancer and radio host Lance Bass, Broadway actress Andrea McArdle, Alex Newell from Glee, former Olympian Greg Louganis, and The Pointer Sisters. President of the United States Barack Obama made a surprise video appearance.

Events and Venues
The Games featured 37 disciplines of sport and cultural events throughout Cleveland-Akron region.

Cleveland

Ceremonies and Other Events

Akron

Other Sites

Records set 
At 99 years old, Ida Keeling set an international sporting record at the 2014 Gay Games, becoming the first person in the 95-99 age category to run the 100 meters in an internationally certified race, running the race in 59.8 seconds.

Brian Jacobson, at age 40, lowered the Masters long course world record in the 50 free to 23.31.

Kinnon MacKinnon, at age 28, became the first openly transgender man to earn a gold in powerlifting at the Gay Games.

See also 

 Federation of Gay Games, the sanctioning body of the Gay Games
 Gay Games
 Principle 6 campaign
 Cleveland-Akron 2014 Home Page

References

External links
 Federation of Gay Games

2014
2014 in LGBT history
2014 in multi-sport events
2014 in sports in Ohio
2010s in Cleveland
LGBT events in Ohio
Sports competitions in Cleveland
Multi-sport events in the United States
2014 in American sports
August 2014 sports events in the United States